Walter was a medieval Bishop of Rochester.

Walter was the brother of Theobald of Bec, who was Archbishop of Canterbury from 1139 to 1161. Theobald selected Walter to be Archdeacon of Canterbury soon after Theobald's election, and it was Theobald who secured Walter's election to Rochester.

Walter was elected on 27 January 1148 and consecrated on 14 March 1148. He died on 26 July 1182.

Citations

References

 
 British History Online Archdeacons of Canterbury accessed on 30 October 2007
 British History Online Bishops of Rochester accessed on 30 October 2007
 

Bishops of Rochester
12th-century English Roman Catholic bishops
Archdeacons of Canterbury
1182 deaths
Anglo-Normans
Year of birth unknown